Adelardo is a given name. Notable people with the name include:

 Adelardo Cattaneo (died 1214), Italian cardinal
 Adelardo López de Ayala y Herrera (1828–1879), Spanish writer and politician
 Adelardo Covarsí (1885–1951), Spanish painter
 Adelardo Rodríguez (born 1939), former Spanish footballer